Salicylic acid is an organic compound with the formula HOC6H4COOH.  A colorless, bitter-tasting solid, it is a precursor to and a metabolite of aspirin (acetylsalicylic acid). It is a plant hormone, and has been listed by the EPA Toxic Substances Control Act (TSCA) Chemical Substance Inventory as an experimental teratogen. The name is from Latin salix for willow tree. It is an  ingredient in some anti-acne products. Salts and esters of salicylic acid are known as salicylates.

Uses

Medicine 

Salicylic acid as a medication is commonly used to remove the outer layer of the skin. As such, it is used to treat warts, psoriasis, acne vulgaris, ringworm, dandruff, and ichthyosis.

Similar to other hydroxy acids, salicylic acid is an ingredient in many skincare products for the treatment of seborrhoeic dermatitis, acne, psoriasis, calluses, corns, keratosis pilaris, acanthosis nigricans, ichthyosis, and warts.

Uses in manufacturing
Salicylic acid is used as a food preservative, a bactericide, and an antiseptic.

Salicylic acid is used in the production of other pharmaceuticals, including 4-aminosalicylic acid, sandulpiride, and landetimide (via salethamide).

Salicylic acid has long been a key starting material for making acetylsalicylic acid (aspirin). Aspirin (acetylsalicylic acid or ASA) is prepared by the esterification of the phenolic hydroxyl group of salicylic acid with the acetyl group from acetic anhydride or acetyl chloride. ASA is the standard to which all the other non-steroidal anti-inflammatory drugs (NSAIDs) are compared. In veterinary medicine, this group of drugs is mainly used for treatment of inflammatory musculoskeletal disorders.

Bismuth subsalicylate, a salt of bismuth and salicylic acid, is the active ingredient in stomach-relief aids such as Pepto-Bismol, is the main ingredient of Kaopectate, and "displays anti-inflammatory action (due to salicylic acid) and also acts as an antacid and mild antibiotic".

Other derivatives include methyl salicylate used as a liniment to soothe joint and muscle pain and choline salicylate used topically to relieve the pain of mouth ulcers. Aminosalicylic acid is used to induce remission in ulcerative colitis, and has been used as an antitubercular agent often administered in association with isoniazid.

Sodium salicylate is a useful phosphor in the vacuum ultraviolet spectral range, with nearly flat quantum efficiency for wavelengths between 10 and 100 nm. It fluoresces in the blue at 420 nm. It is easily prepared on a clean surface by spraying a saturated solution of the salt in methanol followed by evaporation.

Mechanism of action
Salicylic acid modulates COX-1 enzymatic activity to decrease the formation of pro-inflammatory prostaglandins. Salicylate may competitively inhibit prostaglandin formation. Salicylate's antirheumatic (nonsteroidal anti-inflammatory) actions are a result of its analgesic and anti-inflammatory mechanisms.

Salicylic acid, when applied to the skin surface, works by causing the cells of the epidermis to slough off more readily, preventing pores from clogging up, and allowing room for new cell growth. Salicylic acid inhibits the oxidation of uridine-5-diphosphoglucose (UDPG) competitively with nicotinamide adenine dinucleotide and noncompetitively with UDPG. It also competitively inhibits the transferring of glucuronyl group of uridine-5-phosphoglucuronic acid  to the phenolic acceptor.

The wound-healing retardation action of salicylates is probably due mainly to its inhibitory action on mucopolysaccharide synthesis.

Safety

If high concentrations of salicylic ointment are applied to a large percentage of body surface, high levels of salicylic acid can enter the blood, requiring hemodialysis to avoid further complications.

Production and chemical reactions

Biosynthesis
Salicylic acid is biosynthesized from the amino acid phenylalanine. In Arabidopsis thaliana, it can be synthesized via a phenylalanine-independent pathway.

Industrial synthesis
Sodium salicylate is commercially prepared by treating sodium phenolate (the sodium salt of phenol) with carbon dioxide at high pressure (100atm) and high temperature (115°C) – a method known as the Kolbe-Schmitt reaction. Acidification of the product with sulfuric acid gives salicylic acid:

It can also be prepared by the hydrolysis of aspirin (acetylsalicylic acid) or methyl salicylate (oil of wintergreen) with a strong acid or base.

Reactions
Upon heating, salicylic acid converts to phenyl salicylate:
2HOC6H4CO2H  →  C6H5O2C6H4OH  +  CO2  +  H2O
Further heating gives xanthone.

Salicylic acid as its conjugate base is a chelating agent, with an affinity for iron(III).

Salicylic acid slowly degrades to phenol and carbon dioxide at 200–230 °C: 
C6H4OH(CO2H)  →  C6H5OH  +  CO2

History

Willow has long been used for medicinal purposes. Dioscorides, whose writings were highly influential for more than 1,500 years, used 'Itea' (which was possibly a species of willow)  as a treatment for 'painful intestinal obstructions,' birth control, for 'those who spit blood,' to remove calluses and corns and, externally, as a 'warm pack for gout.' William Turner, in 1597, repeated this, saying that willow bark, 'being burnt to ashes, and steeped in vinegar, takes away corns and other like risings in the feet and toes.' Some of these cures may describe the action of salicylic acid, which can be derived from the salicin present in willow. It is, however, a modern myth that Hippocrates used willow as a painkiller.

Hippocrates, Galen, Pliny the Elder, and others knew that decoctions containing salicylate could ease pain and reduce fevers.

It was used in Europe and China to treat these conditions. This remedy is mentioned in texts from Ancient Egypt, Sumer, and Assyria.

The Cherokee and other Native Americans use an infusion of the bark for fever and other medicinal purposes. In 2014, archaeologists identified traces of salicylic acid on seventh-century pottery fragments found in east-central Colorado.

The Reverend Edward Stone, a vicar from Chipping Norton, Oxfordshire, England, reported in 1763 that the bark of the willow was effective in reducing a fever.

An extract of willow bark, called salicin, after the Latin name for the white willow (Salix alba), was isolated and named by German chemist Johann Andreas Buchner in 1828. A larger amount of the substance was isolated in 1829 by Henri Leroux, a French pharmacist. Raffaele Piria, an Italian chemist, was able to convert the substance into a sugar and a second component, which on oxidation becomes salicylic acid.
Salicylic acid was also isolated from the herb meadowsweet (Filipendula ulmaria, formerly classified as Spiraea ulmaria) by German researchers in 1839.<ref>{{cite journal|first1=C. |last1=Löwig |first2=S. |last2=Weidmann |journal=Annalen der Physik und Chemie; Beiträge zur Organischen Chemie (Contributions to Organic Chemistry)|url=|year=1839|issue=46 |pages= 57–83|title=III. Untersuchungen mit dem destillierten Wasser der Blüthen von Spiraea Ulmaria | trans-title=III. Investigations of the water distilled from the blossoms of Spiraea ulmaria}} Löwig and Weidman called salicylic acid Spiräasaure (spiraea acid)</ref> Their extract caused digestive problems such as gastric irritation, bleeding, diarrhea, and even death when consumed in high doses.

In 1874 the Scottish physician Thomas MacLagan experimented with salicin as a treatment for acute rheumatism, with considerable success, as he reported in The Lancet in 1876. Meanwhile, German scientists tried sodium salicylate with less success and more severe side effects.

In 1979, salicylates were found to be involved in induced defenses of tobacco against tobacco mosaic virus. In 1987, salicylic acid was identified as the long-sought signal that causes thermogenic plants, such as the voodoo lily, Sauromatum guttatum, to produce heat.

 Dietary sources 
Salicylic acid occurs in plants as free salicylic acid and its carboxylated esters and phenolic glycosides. Several studies suggest that humans metabolize salicylic acid in measurable quantities from these plants. High-salicylate beverages and foods include beer, coffee, tea, numerous fruits and vegetables, sweet potato, nuts, and olive oil. Meat, poultry, fish, eggs, dairy products, sugar, breads and cereals have low salicylate content.

Some people with sensitivity to dietary salicylates may have symptoms of allergic reaction, such as bronchial asthma, rhinitis, gastrointestinal disorders, or diarrhea, so may need to adopt a low-salicylate diet.

Plant hormone
Salicylic acid  is a phenolic phytohormone, and is found in plants with roles in plant growth and development, photosynthesis, transpiration, and ion uptake and transport. Salicylic acid is involved in endogenous signaling, mediating plant defense against pathogens. It plays a role in the resistance to pathogens (i.e. systemic acquired resistance) by inducing the production of pathogenesis-related proteins and other defensive metabolites. SA's defense signaling role is most clearly demonstrated by experiments which do away with it: Delaney et al. 1994, Gaffney et al. 1993, Lawton et al. 1995, and Vernooij et al. 1994 each use Nicotiana tabacum or Arabidopsis expressing nahG, for salicylate hydroxylase. Pathogen inoculation did not produce the customarily high SA levels, SAR was not produced, and no PR genes were expressed in systemic leaves. Indeed, the subjects were more susceptible to virulent  and even normally avirulent  pathogens.

Exogenously, salicylic acid can aid plant development via enhanced seed germination, bud flowering, and fruit ripening, though too high of a concentration of salicylic acid can negatively regulate these developmental processes.

The volatile methyl ester of salicylic acid, methyl salicylate, can also diffuse through the air, facilitating plant-plant communication. Methyl salicylate is taken up by the stomata of the nearby plant, where it can induce an immune response after being converted back to salicylic acid.

 Signal transduction 
A number of proteins have been identified that interact with SA in plants, especially salicylic acid binding proteins (SABPs) and the NPR genes (Nonexpressor of pathogenesis related genes), which are putative receptors.

 See also 

 Salsalate
 Trolamine salicylate

 References 

 Further reading 
 

 External links 

 Salicylic acid MS Spectrum
 Safety MSDS data
 International Chemical Safety Cards | CDC/NIOSH
 "On the syntheses of salicylic acid": English Translation of Hermann Kolbe's seminal 1860 German article "Ueber Synthese der Salicylsäure" in Annalen der Chemie und Pharmacie'' at MJLPHD

 
Anti-acne preparations
Antiseptics
Chelating agents
Monohydroxybenzoic acids
Nonsteroidal anti-inflammatory drugs
Plant hormones
World Health Organization essential medicines